Homenetmen Sports Association Beirut, or simply Homenetmen, is a football club based in Beirut, Lebanon, that competes in the . It is the association football branch of the larger Lebanese-Armenian multi-sports and scouting organisation of the same name.

Homenetmen Beirut was established in 1924, just six years after establishment of Homenetmen in Constantinople. The club won seven Lebanese Premier League and three Lebanese FA Cup titles. They also participated in the Asian Champion Club Tournament in 1970, finishing in third place.

History
Homenetmen Beirut were founded in 1924, as one of the oldest teams in the region. The initial headquarters of Homenetmen Lebanon were in the Zuqaq al-Blat quarter of Beirut, before moving to Bourj Hammoud. Homenetmen were affiliated to the Tashnag party. In 1927, the team played their first game against a foreign team in Aleppo, Syria, beating Homenetmen Aleppo 1–0.

Homenetmen first won the Lebanese Premier League in 1943–44; they won the league a further six times, holding a then-record seven titles. Homenetmen also finished as league runners-up seven times, and won the Lebanese FA Cup three times.

In 1970, Homenetmen represented Lebanon at the Asian Champion Club Tournament for the first time; having refused to play Hapoel Tel Aviv of Israel in the semi-final on political grounds, they beat PSMS Medan of Indonesia in the third-place match. Homenetmen's refusal to play Hapoel was one of the reasons for the Israel Football Association's expulsion from the Asian Football Confederation in 1974.

Following the Lebanese Civil War, Homenetmen fell into dismay: they were relegated to the Lebanese Second Division for the first time in 2002, and to the Lebanese Third Division in 2005. In 2021, Homenetmen were relegated to the Lebanese Fourth Division.

Rivalries 
Homenetmen have a historic rivalry with fellow-Lebanese-Armenian club Homenmen.

Honours
 Lebanese Premier League
Winners (7): 1943–44, 1945–46, 1947–48, 1950–51, 1954–55, 1962–63, 1968–69
 Lebanese FA Cup
Winners (3): 1942–43, 1947–48, 1961–62
 Lebanese Second Division
 Winners (1): 2002–03

Asian record 
 Asian Champion Club Tournament: 1 appearance
 1970: Third place

See also
 Armenians in Lebanon
List of football clubs in Lebanon

References

External links

 Team profile at Soccerway

 
1924 establishments in Lebanon
Association football clubs established in 1924
Armenian association football clubs outside Armenia
Armenian football clubs in Lebanon
Diaspora sports clubs
Football clubs in Lebanon
Sport in Beirut